Trekkies 2 is a 2004 American documentary film directed by Roger Nygard, and the sequel to the 1997 film Trekkies. The film travels throughout the world, mainly Europe, to show fans of Star Trek, commonly known as Trekkies. It also profiles people from the first film, including Barbara Adams and Gabriel Köerner. Also featured are Star Trek-themed punk bands from Sacramento, California, including Warp 11 and the "No Kill I" franchise.

Reception 
MaryAnn Johanson of "Flick Filosopher" wrote "this time out the focus is on the real people behind the Spock ears, and the film recognizes that they’re a lot more clever, creative, self-aware, and generous than the uninitiated will have realized."

Nick Schager of "Lessons of Darkness" gave it D+ grade. He called it "a repetitive hodgepodge" and "More sloppily constructed than the first film".

References

External links
 
 
 
 

2004 films
2004 direct-to-video films
Direct-to-video documentary films
Documentary films about fandom
Documentary films about Star Trek
Star Trek fandom
2000s English-language films
Films directed by Roger Nygard

sv:Trekkies 2